Spruce Run Evangelical Lutheran Zion Church, also known as Spruce Run Lutheran Church, is located at 442 West Hill Road in the Spruce Run section of Lebanon Township in Hunterdon County, New Jersey. The congregation is a member of the New Jersey Synod and the Evangelical Lutheran Church in America (ELCA).

The congregation was organized in 1774 by thirteen members who worshiped in the barn of Frederick Fritts in the summer, and in his home during the winter. Initially, services were conducted every four weeks, and were exclusively in German.

In 1861, Spruce Run Lutheran Church was the site of the first convention of the New Jersey Synod of churches. The new Synod met there again in 1868.

Church building
The first church building was built in 1800. Of frame construction from yellow poplar, the church was known as the “red church.” This was a Union church, combining Reformed and Lutheran congregations.

In 1835 a new stone church was built to the left of the old frame church.
 
The cornerstone for the present church building was laid on July 30, 1870, and the church was dedicated on March 9, 1871.

Cemetery

The original cemetery is located across the road, featuring “God’s Acre” at the top of the entrance gate. It is the oldest church cemetery in the township.

Clergy
The church’s first pastor was Reverend William Graf, who began serving the congregation in 1774. His formal call as pastor began in July 1775; he served until 1800, as part of a circuit of six other area Lutheran churches.

On September 2, 1834, the church called its own pastor, Rev. Robert Collyer. From that time on the church maintained complete independence from the other circuit churches.

List of clergy
The church has had 22 pastors, comprising 23 pastoral tenures (Rev. Steven Traver served twice, from 1900-1905 and 1927-1947).

References

External links 
 
 Spruce Run Lutheran Church official website
 

Churches in Hunterdon County, New Jersey
German-American history
Lebanon Township, New Jersey
Lutheran churches in New Jersey
Churches completed in 1800
Churches completed in 1835
Churches completed in 1871
1774 establishments in New Jersey